Broadacre in Australia is land suitable for farms practicing large-scale crop operations. The key crop segments in this category are as follows:

 oilseeds - canola, sunflowers
 winter and summer cereals - wheat, barley, oats, triticale, sorghum, maize, millets
 pulses - lupins, chickpeas, faba beans, field peas, mung beans, soybeans, lentils
 sugar cane
 rice

References
Advances in broadacre. Baulkham Hills, N.S.W.: Rhone-Poulenc, 1999.
 Analysis of broadacre land in the Adelaide and Outer Adelaide Statistical Divisions.

External links
 Sustainable Broadacre Cropping. Western Australian No-Tillage Farmers Association (WANTFA)
 Broadacre Crop Protection
Agriculture in Australia
Land management in Australia